Crime & Investigation Network (also known on promotions as "CI" and branded on-air and stylized as "Crime + Investigation") is a Southeast Asian pay television channel which focuses on crime, investigation and mystery programming. It is run by A+E Networks Asia, a joint-venture between A+E Networks and Astro Holdings Sdn Bhd and was launched on June 15, 2007.

It was available initially in Malaysia, Brunei, Singapore, and Hong Kong and then from 2008 in the Philippines, Thailand and Indonesia. It is also currently available in Taiwan via the CHT MOD IPTV service.

Press Release
The History Channel and Crime & Investigation Network to launch on June 15th in South East Asia, AETN International

Programming
 24 to Life
48 Hours Mystery
Australian Federal Police: Frontline
Beyond Scared Straight
Bloodwork
Born To Kill?
Bordertown: Laredo
Catching The Craigslist Killer
Cajun Justice
Crime & Punishment
Crime: Crossing The Line
Dog The Bounty Hunter
Evil Up Close
Fatal Vows
FBI: Criminal Pursuit
Forensic Investigators
Justice Files
Look Who's Stalking
Medical Detectives
Murder On The Social Network
My Crazy Ex
On The Case
Parking Wars
Real Crime
Real Interrogations
 See No Evil
Sins & Secrets
Steven Seagal Firearm
The First 48
The First 48: Missing Persons
The Nightclub Killer
The Will: Family Secrets Revealed
Vanished With Beth Holloway
Wicked Attraction

See also
A+E Networks
Astro Holdings Sdn Bhd
Bio Asia
History Asia
Crime & Investigation Network

External links
 Crime & Investigation Network (Asia)

A&E Networks
Television channels and stations established in 2007
English-language television stations
Mass media in Southeast Asia